Chionodes icriodes is a moth in the family Gelechiidae. It is found in Argentina and southern Chile.

References

Chionodes
Moths described in 1931
Moths of South America